Home is the third studio album released by American singer Monifah. It was released by Universal Records on October 17, 2000 in the United States, with Teddy Riley serving as both an executive producer and chief producer on the album. Despite input from Riley, Home was both a critical and commercial failure, becoming her lowest-selling and lowest-charting album, only making it to number 151 on the US Billboard 200 and 39 on the Top R&B/Hip-Hop Albums. The album's only charting single was "I Can Tell"; it was minor hit on the R&B charts.

Critical reception

AllMusic editor Jon Azpiri wrote that "those who know Monifah from her thumping 1998 dance hit "Touch It" will be pleasantly surprised by her lush vocals on Home. However, those who are familiar with Monifah's impressive debut album, Moods...Moments, will be disappointed by Home's poor production and meandering lyrics. Most of the highlights on Home come during its quieter moments [...] Monifah is a considerable talent that is lost among the mediocrity that surrounds her. For Monifah, quality production and strong material are a long way from Home." Craig Seymour from Entertainment Weekly found that "Monifah traffics in moving, mid-tempo tales of yearning, heartbreak, and redemption through self-love on her third album Home.

Track listing

Notes
 signifies co-producer

Charts

References

2000 albums
Monifah albums
Universal Records albums
Albums produced by Teddy Riley